The 2021 Oregon Ducks football team represented the University of Oregon during the 2021 NCAA Division I FBS football season. The team was led by fourth-year head coach Mario Cristobal, who left the program for another head coaching role in early December. The Ducks played their home games at Autzen Stadium in Eugene, Oregon, and competed as members of the North Division of the Pac-12 Conference.

Schedule 

Schedule Sources:

Rankings

Roster

Game summaries

vs Fresno State

at No. 3 Ohio State

First win against Ohio State (0–9 previously).

vs Stony Brook

vs Arizona

at Stanford

vs California

at UCLA

vs Colorado

at Washington

vs Washington State

at No. 23 Utah

vs Oregon State

vs No. 17 Utah (Pac-12 Championship Game)

vs No. 16 Oklahoma (2021 Alamo Bowl)

Statistics

References

Oregon
Oregon Ducks football seasons
Oregon Ducks football